This is a list of karst features in Western Australia. It includes all named features that occur in the Australian Speleological Federation Karst Index Database (KID). The term "karst feature" is an umbrella term for topographical features formed from the dissolution of soluble rocks such as limestone, dolomite, and gypsum. While the majority of features in the list below refer to cave entrances, some other features include cliffs, gorges and a calcified wooden water wheel.

Karst Features
Each feature is given a unique identification number, and many are also given a name. This list is restricted to named features. For conservation reasons, the precise locations of features are not made available to the public. However, most features are allocated to an area.

The list shows karst features (e.g. a cave entrance), not cave systems, so caves with 2 or more entrance points will appear multiple times in the list.

References

Further reading
 Watson, J.R. (editor) 1982 Australian Conference on Cave Tourism and Management (4th : 1981 : Yallingup) – Proceedings of the fourth Australian Conference on Cave Tourism and Management : Yallingup, Western Australia, September 1981 . hosted jointly by Busselton Tourist Bureau and Australian Speleological Federation. Perth: National Parks Authority, Western Australia and The Federation Series 	Cave management in Australia, 0159-54 15 ; 4

See also
List of caves in Australia

Western Australia
Caves

Caves